Railways cricket team (also known as the Indian Railways) is a domestic cricket team in India representing  Indian Railways. The team's home ground is East Coast Railway Stadium in Bhubaneswar and Karnail Singh Stadium in New Delhi.  The team is run by the Railways Sports Promotion Board which fields the Railways cricket team in domestic cricket competitions in India such as the Ranji Trophy.

Competition history
For most of its history, the Indian Railways has met little success in the Ranji Trophy. However, in recent years since 2000, Railways have won the trophy twice and become runners-up one time. As Champions of the Ranji Trophy, they have played the Irani Trophy twice, emerging victorious on both occasions.

Honours
 Ranji Trophy
 Winners (2): 2001–02, 2004–05
 Runners-up (2): 1987–88, 2000–01

 Wills Trophy
 Runners-up: 1988-89

Famous players
Players from Railways who have played Test cricket for India, along with year of Test debut:
Budhi Kunderan (1960)
Murali Kartik (2000)
Sanjay Bangar (2001)
Karn Sharma (2014)

Players from Railways who have played ODI but not Test cricket for India, along with year of ODI debut:
Jai Prakash Yadav (2002)

Current squad
Players with international caps are listed in bold.

Updated as on 24 January 2023

References

Indian first-class cricket teams
Sport in Indian Railways
Cricket clubs established in 1958
1958 establishments in India